The Adem was an Italian-built car sold on the British market in 1912 by A. De Martini after his departure from the Martini company. Its 17.9 horsepower 4-cylinder monobloc engine had a capacity of 2.9 litres and a four-speed gearbox. It was cooled by fan blades on the flywheel. The car was not commercially successful, and it is possible none were sold.

References
Georgano, G.N., "Adem", in G.N. Georgano, ed., The Complete Encyclopedia of Motorcars 1885-1968  (New York: E.P. Dutton and Co., 1974), pp. 27.

Cars of Italy